Saint-Max is a commune in the Meurthe-et-Moselle department in north-eastern France.

Geography
The city of Saint-Max is located in north-eastern France, a suburb of Nancy. The surrounding communities are: Nancy, Essey-lès-Nancy, Tomblaine, Dommartemont and Malzéville.
Since 2016, it is part of the Métropole du Grand Nancy.

Population

Places and monuments
The Chateau du Pont de Meurthe is a beautiful large mansion of Napoleon III that completed in 1874. One can admire, among others, a beautiful stone staircase with a wrought iron railing and a carved wood fireplace. By 1955, it became the property of the city and has hosted successive CREPS, college, general education, a physical rehabilitation centre school. In 1976, the library moved there. In 1990, it was the turn of the school music.

See also
Communes of the Meurthe-et-Moselle department

References

Saintmax